Greigia vulcanica is a species of flowering plant in the Bromeliaceae family. It is native to Colombia and Ecuador.

References

vulcanica
Flora of Ecuador
Flora of Colombia
Plants described in 1888
Taxa named by Édouard André